Ignalina District Municipality is one of 60 municipalities in Lithuania.

Structure 
District structure:   
 2 cities – Dūkštas and Ignalina;
 3 towns – Mielagėnai, Rimšė and Tverečius;
 726 villages.
 Ignalina District Municipality consists of 12 smaller administration units - elderships.
  
Population of largest Ignalina District Municipality elderships (2014-07-01): 
Ignalina town – 5605
Didžiasalis – 1691
Vidiškės – 1278
Dūkštas – 1756
Kazitiškis – 1039
Naujasis Daugėliškis – 1491
Mielagėnai – 887
Ceikiniai – 533
Linkmenys – 970
Rimšė – 999
Tverečius – 590

In total - 18414 inhabitants.

Elderships 
Ignalina District Municipality is divided into 12 elderships:

Nature and geography

See also
Aukštaitija National Park

References

 
Municipalities of Utena County
Municipalities of Lithuania